Eduard Liviu Bartales (15 May 1954 – 28 November 2013) was a Romanian footballer.

His father was an Italian named Nicola Bartelli who settled in Romania, but the Communist authorities made him change his name to Nicolae Bartales, in order to "sound more Romanian". Eduard Liviu Bartales died on 28 November 2013, aged 59, in Bucharest, Romania. His funeral took place on 1 December at the Cimitirul Străuleşti.

Honours
Rapid București
Divizia B: 1974–75
Cupa României: 1974–75

Notes

References

1954 births
2013 deaths
Footballers from Bucharest
Romanian footballers
Romanian people of Italian descent
Association football wingers
Liga I players
Liga II players
FC Rapid București players
Chimia Râmnicu Vâlcea players